Events from the year 1692 in Sweden

Incumbents
 Monarch – Charles XI

Events

 - The exiled mystic Eva Margareta Frölich return to Stockholm to preach.

Births

 13 January - Gunnila Grubb, hymn writer (died 1729) 
 11 September - Ingela Gathenhielm,  privateer in service of King Charles XII of Sweden during the Great Northern War.
 Jacob Pettersson Degenaar, pirate (died 1766)

Deaths

 17 May - Countess Palatine Eleonora Catherine of Zweibrücken, cousin and foster sister of Queen Christina of Sweden and sister of King Charles X of Sweden
 September - Eva Margareta Frölich, mystic, prophet, visionary and Pietistic writer

References

 
Years of the 17th century in Sweden
Sweden